Hero Mask (stylized as HERO≠MASK) is a Japanese original net animation (ONA) anime series produced by Pierrot for Netflix. The series is written and directed by Hiroyasu Aoki, and premiered worldwide on December 3, 2018. A second season premiered on August 23, 2019.

In June 2020, it was announced that Hero Mask would receive a manga spin-off titled Hero Mask: A lost memory which would be serialized on the LINE Manga app starting on July 7, 2020. The anime aired on Tokyo MX from July 2, 2020, to December 10, 2020, making it the first true Netflix original anime to broadcast on linear television in Japan.

Plot
Set in a fictional version of London, James Blood is a hot-blooded officer working for the elite "Special Service of Crime" (SSC) division within the Capital Police Department. Sarah Sinclair is a subordinate to Crown Prosecutor Monica Campbell, whose witness suddenly drops dead while working on a high-profile case involving the LIVE Corporation. Shortly thereafter, the police station is attacked by an enemy James thought long dead. James ends up teaming with Sarah to uncover the perpetrators behind these events, dragging them into a conspiracy involving LIVE, escaped prisoners who supposedly died years ago, and masks that give their wearers superhuman abilities.

Characters

 (Japanese); Greg Chun (English; Netflix Dub); Chris Patton (English; Sentai Filmworks Dub)
A hot-blooded Detective Inspector (DI) working with the SSC in the Capital Police Department. After fighting off his arch-nemesis Grimm, who he thought to be dead, multiple times, he decides to look for answers with Sarah. Later, he also protects Tina from Geffrey Connor. Gets exposed to the same energy experienced by Julia Herst when she died, leaving him to use a Mask similar to Tina's.

 (Japanese); Lauren Landa (English; Netflix Dub); Luci Christian (English; Sentai Filmworks Dub)
An assistant attorney working in the Crown Prosecution Service (CPS). After she witnesses Monica collapse in the street before giving her vital information, she believes she was murdered, and teams up with James to find the perpetrator. She also works with Oliver Henderson to figure out the connection between Live Corporation and Monica.

 (Japanese); Brad Venable (English; Netflix Dub); Josh Morrison (English; Sentai Filmworks Dub)
Detective Chief Inspector (DCI) Galllagher is the Senior Investigation Officer (SIO) of the Mask case and James' superior at the SSC.

 (Japanese); Landon McDonald (English; Netflix Dub); Blake Shepard (English; Sentai Filmworks Dub)
A technical specialist and Detective Sergeant (DS) at the SSC who designs and maintains multiple gadgets for the organization, including the "GPS Bullets" that James is fond of using.

 (Japanese); Chris Niosi (English; Netflix Dub); Andrew Love (English; Sentai Filmworks Dub)
A former SSC detective who disappeared after his girlfriend collapsed one day. Currently working as a mercenary for the LIVE Corporation, helping Geffrey Connor continue research on the Masks.

 (Japanese); Cam Clarke (English; Netflix Dub); Jay Hickman (English; Sentai Filmworks Dub)
One of the researchers for the development of the Masks, he is determined to see the Masks' fruition, using Harry Creighton to hunt down opposition and investigators. Believes that technology should be made for humankind at the expense of some.

 (Japanese); Jason Marnocha (English; Netflix Dub); John Gremillion (English; Sentai Filmworks Dub)
The CEO of Live Corporation, he is heavily connected to the development of the Masks.

 (Japanese); Armen Taylor (English; Netflix Dub); Mark Laskowski (English; Sentai Filmworks Dub)
The Detective Chief Superintendent (DCS) in charge of the SSC. He resigns after the death of his wife during a bank robbery.

 (Japanese); Julia McIivaine (English; Netflix Dub); Sara Gaston (English; Sentai Filmworks Dub)
An investigator for the SSC that worked at Ecohes, she was killed by Live Corporation for getting too deep into the investigation of the development of the Masks.

 (Japanese) Cam Clarke (English; Netflix Dub); Joe Daniels (English; Sentai Filmworks Dub)
One of the researchers for the development of the Masks. Also the brother of Geffrey Connor, believing that technology should help everyone without the expense of others.

 (Japanese); Sean Chiplock (English; Netflix Dub); Scott Gibbs (English; Sentai Filmworks Dub)
A criminal who is known for a string of killings and is known to be mentally unstable. He heavily dislikes James since James had arrested him and put him in prison. Used as a test subject for the masks before escaping.

 (Japanese); Kira Buckland (English; Netflix Dub); Tayler Fono (English; Sentai Filmworks Dub)
Harry Creighton's lover, she suffered heart failure, leading to Harry Creighton defecting from the SSC.

 (Japanese); Rachel Robinson (English; Netflix Dub); Christine Auten (English; Sentai Filmworks Dub)
The CEO of the drug company Ecohes, helps James to keep Tina from getting captured by Geffrey Connor.

Voiced by: Xander Mobus (English; Netflix Dub); Adam Gibbs (English; Sentai Filmworks Dub)
A criminal who took multiple doctors hostage in a hospital to get a heart transplant for his daughter. Theo supposedly died in prison but was secretly used as a test subject for the masks before escaping with the others. Wishes to see his estranged family before he dies.

 (Japanese); Kayli Mills (English; Netflix Dub); Hilary Haag (English; Sentai Filmworks Dub)
Her father, William Herst (ウィリアム・ハースト), takes care of her as her mother, Julia Herst (ジュリア・ハースト), died in an accident during the development of the Masks, pregnant with :Tina. Tina was also exposed to the energy of the accident, and was given a Mask to perpetually keep her from dying from the energy. Geffrey Connor wants her mask in order to finish the Masks.

Production

Anime
The series is written and directed by Hiroyasu Aoki and is animated by Studio Pierrot. Takahisa Katagiri is providing the series' character designs, and Hisaki Kato is composing the music. The 15-episode first season premiered worldwide on Netflix on December 3, 2018. The 9-episode second season premiered on August 23, 2019. The main cast and staff members reprised their roles.

Hero Mask was released in North America by Sentai Filmworks.

Manga
The manga Hero Mask: A lost memory was first serialized in Japan on July 7, 2020, with new chapters made every week. Serialization was completed on September 15, 2020.

It was published in paperback in Japan on March 15, 2021.

Episodes

Season 1 (2018)

Season 2 (2019)

References

External links
  
 Hero Mask on Netflix
 

2018 anime ONAs
2010s adult animated television series
Japanese adult animated action television series
Action anime and manga
Crime in anime and manga
Detective anime and manga
Japanese-language Netflix original programming
Netflix original anime
Pierrot (company)
Sentai Filmworks